Vainly Clutching at Phantom Limbs is the first full-length release by indie rock band Elf Power. Released in 1995, it is a compact disc reissue of their debut LP and 7" single on Arena Rock Recording Co.

Track listing
"Pioneer Mansion"
"Temporary Arm"
"All You Experiments"
"Finally Free"
"Drug Store"
"Loverboy's Demise"
"Slither Hither"
"Circular Malevolence"
"When the Serpents Approach"
"Surgery"
"Vainly Clutching at Phantom Limbs"
"Arachnid Dungeon Attack"
"Grand Intrusion Call"
"Monster Surprise"
"Heroes and Insects"
"The Winter Hawk"
"Exalted Exit Wound"

Personnel
 Andrew Rieger - guitar, vocals, flute, organ, bass, drums
 Eric Ledford - cello (1)
 Raleigh Hatfield  - guitar (1)
 Laura Carter - drums (2)
 Dave Rathgeber - vocals (10)

References

1995 debut albums
Elf Power albums
Arena Rock Recording Company albums